Van Riebeeck Park is a residential suburb of Kempton Park, Gauteng, South Africa.

History
Named in 1952, it obtained its name after the tercentennial anniversary of the landing of Jan van Riebeeck.

Education
It has a high school named Jeugland Hoërskool and a primary school named Laerskool Van Riebeeckpark, just a few kilometers apart.

References

Suburbs of Kempton Park, Gauteng